The Ontario Micropolitan Statistical Area (or Ontario μSA), as defined by the United States Census Bureau, is an area consisting of two counties – one in southeastern Oregon and one in southwestern Idaho, anchored by the city of Ontario.

As of the 2000 census, the area had a population of 52,193 (though a July 1, 2009 estimate placed the population at 53,844).

Counties
Malheur County, Oregon
Payette County, Idaho

Communities
Adrian, Oregon
Arock, Oregon (unincorporated)
Brogan, Oregon (unincorporated)
Fruitland, Idaho
Jordan Valley, Oregon
Juntura, Oregon (unincorporated)
McDermitt, Nevada-Oregon (unincorporated; partial)
New Plymouth, Idaho
Nyssa, Oregon
Ontario, Oregon (Principal city)
Payette, Idaho (Payette County seat)
Riverside, Oregon (unincorporated)
Rome, Oregon (unincorporated)
Vale, Oregon (Malheur County seat)

Demographics
As of the census of 2000, there were 52,193 people, 17,592 households, and 12,920 families residing within the μSA. The racial makeup of the μSA was 81.49% White, 0.78% African American, 0.96% Native American, 1.52% Asian, 0.06% Pacific Islander, 12.73% from other races, and 2.47% from two or more races. Hispanic or Latino of any race were 20.22% of the population.

The median income for a household in the μSA was $31,644, and the median income for a family was $36,551. Males had a median income of $28,065 versus $21,593 for females. The per capita income for the μSA was $14,410.

See also
Oregon census statistical areas
Idaho census statistical areas

References